The Big Gamble may refer to:

 The Big Gamble (1931 film)
 The Big Gamble (1961 film)